Papal travel outside Rome has been historically rare, and voluntary travel of the pope was non-existent for the first 500 years. Pope John Paul II (1978–2005) undertook more pastoral trips than all his predecessors combined. Pope Francis (2013–present), Pope Paul VI (1963–1978) and Pope Benedict XVI (2005–2013) also travelled globally, the latter to a lesser extent due to his advanced age.

Popes resided outside Rome—primarily in Viterbo, Orvieto, and Perugia—during the 13th century, and then absconded to France during the Avignon Papacy (1309–1378). Pope Vigilius (537–555) in 547, Pope Agatho (678–681) in 680, and Pope Constantine in 710 visited Constantinople, whereas Pope Martin I (649–655) was abducted there for trial in 653. Pope Stephen II (752–757) became the first pope to cross the Alps in 752 to crown Pepin the Short; Pope Pius VII repeated the feat over a millennium later for the coronation of Napoleon.

Travel before the Second Vatican Council

Outside Rome, within Italy

Pope Clement I was exiled to Chersonesos Taurica by Roman emperor Trajan and then martyred into the Black Sea, according to apocryphal accounts circa 99. Pope Pontian (230–235) died in exile in Sardinia, but resigned his pontificate before leaving the city. Pope Cornelius (251–253) died after a year of exile in Civitavecchia, 80 km from Rome. Pope Liberius (352–366) was the first pope to get far from the city as pope when he was exiled to Beroea in Thrace by Roman Emperor Constantius II. Pope John I (523–526) became the first pope to willfully travel outside Rome when he sailed for Constantinople in 523.

Pope Clement II (1046–1047) was the first pope consecrated outside Rome. Pope Urban II (1088–1099) became the first pope to travel extensively outside Rome. Elected in Terracina, Urban II held synods in Amalfi, Benevento, and Troia. He preached the First Crusade at the Council of Clermont (1095) in Clermont-Ferrand. Prior to this, Pope Leo IX (1049–1054) had been the last pope to cross the Alps for 50 years.

Although the cardinals have historically gathered at a handful of other locations within Rome and beyond, only six elections since 1455 have been held outside the Apostolic Palace, Twenty-eight papal elections have been held outside Rome, in: Terracina (1088), Cluny (1119), Velletri (1181), Verona (1185), Ferrara (Oct. 1187), Pisa (Dec. 1187), Perugia (1216, 1264–1265, 1285, 1292–1294, 1304–1305), Anagni (1243), Naples (1254, 1294), Viterbo (1261, 1268–1271, July 1276, Aug.–Sept. 1276, 1277, 1281–1282), Arezzo (Jan. 1276), Carpentras/Lyon (1314–1316), Avignon (1334, 1342, 1352, 1362, 1370), Konstanz (1417) and Venice (1799–1800).

Outside Italy, within Europe

Constantinople

Pope John I (523–526) in 523 (as a delegate of Theodoric the Great), Pope Vigilius (537–555) in 547 (called by Justinian I to account for his refusal to sign on to the canons of the Council of Chalcedon), Pope Agatho (678–681) in 680 (attending the Third Council of Constantinople), and Pope Constantine in 710 visited Constantinople (called by Justinian II), whereas Pope Martin I (649–653) was abducted there for trial in 653 following the Lateran Council of 649. Constantine was the last pope to visit Constantinople until Pope Paul VI in 1967.

France

Pope Stephen II (752–757) became the first pope to cross the Alps in 752 to crown Pepin the Short. This made him the first pope to visit the Frankish empire. Pope John VIII (872–882) visited France in 878, and Pope Leo IX (1049–1054) travelled to France on September 29, 1049. The next pope to enter France was Pope Urban II (1088–1099), who stopped at Valence and Le Puy on his way to the Council of Clermont (1095).

Pope Pius VII (1800–1823) was in Paris in 1804 for the Coronation of Napoleon I.

Holy Roman Empire

Pope Benedict VIII (1012–1024) visited Bamberg on 14 April 1020; no pope had visited the borders of modern Germany for 150 years. Pope Leo IX (1049–1054) also travelled through the modern borders of Germany. Probably the last papal visit to the Holy Roman Empire was in 1782, when Pope Pius VI visited Joseph II, Holy Roman Emperor, in Vienna, and Munich in Bavaria.

Travel since the 1960s
Pope Paul VI (1963–1978) became the first pope to leave Europe; no pope ever left Europe before the Second Vatican Council. He was the first to travel by airplane as pope, the first to leave Italy since 1809, and the first to visit North America, South America, Africa, Oceania and Asia as pope.

Pope John Paul II travelled more miles as pope than all his predecessors combined,  and as a result he was seen—in person—by more people than anyone else in history. He travelled approximately 721,052 miles, the equivalent of approximately 31 trips around the circumference of the Earth.

Beginning with Pope Paul VI, the popes used Alitalia as their primary airline, flying on charter flights, until Alitalia went out of business in 2021; since then, Italy's ITA Airways has been the main airline used by Pope Francis. Pope John Paul II instituted a tradition of returning to Rome on a flag carrier airline of the last country visited, when possible.

Table of destinations outside Italy (1964–present)
The table lists the international trips outside Italy made by Pope Paul VI, Pope John Paul II, Pope Benedict XVI, and Pope Francis.

Notes

See also
Eugenio Pacelli's 1936 visit to the United States

References

 
History of the papacy
Lists of 21st-century trips
Timelines of Christianity
Voyages